86Box is an IBM PC emulator for Windows, Linux and Mac based on PCem that specializes in running old operating systems and software that are designed for IBM PC compatibles. Originally forked from PCem, it later added support for other IBM PC compatible computers as well.

Features

Hardware 
The main goal of 86Box is to emulate various IBM PC compatible systems/motherboards from 1981 until 1999, which includes almost all IBM PC models (including the IBM PS/1 model 2121 and the IBM PS/2 model 2011) and supports IBM PC compatible systems/motherboards.

86Box is capable of emulating Intel processors (and its respective clones, including AMD, IDT and Cyrix) from Intel 8088 through the Pentium Tillamook MMX/Mobile MMX processors and Pentium Pro/Pentium II processors from 1997 until 1999. A recompiler is being mandatory for P5 Pentium and Cyrix processors and optional for i486 processors and IDT WinChip processors. A rather fast processor is needed for full emulation speed (such as an Intel Core i5 at 4 GHz).

86Box can emulate different graphic modes, this includes text mode, Hercules, CGA (including some composite modes and the 160 × 100 × 16 tweaked modes), Tandy, EGA, VGA (including Mode X and other tweaks), VESA, as well as various video APIs such as DirectX and 3Dfx's Glide. 86Box can also emulate various video cards such as the ATI Mach64 GX and the S3 Trio32/64/Virge series. Voodoo cards are also emulated and added support for Voodoo 1/2/3 and various optimizations. A separate recompiler has been added for Voodoo emulation, making it faster to emulate the Voodoo graphics card.

86Box also emulates some sound cards, such as the AdLib, Sound Blaster (including the Game Blaster), Sound Blaster Pro, Sound Blaster 16, Sound Blaster AWE32, Gravis UltraSound, Innovation SSI-2001, Aztech Sound Galaxy Pro 16, Windows Sound System, Ensoniq AudioPCI 64V/ES1371, and Sound Blaster PCI 128.

Operating system support 
Similar to Virtual PC, Bochs and QEMU, it emulates almost all versions of Microsoft Windows until Windows Vista (including Service Pack 2); MS-DOS, FreeDOS and CP/M-86 are also supported. Earlier versions of OS/2 requires the hard drive to be formatted prior to installation, while OS/2 Warp 3 until Warp 4.5 requires an unaccelerated video card to run. Other operating systems are also supported on 86Box, such as versions of Linux that supports the Pentium processor, BSD derivatives (e.g. FreeBSD), and BeOS 5, which only works on the Award SiS 497 motherboard.

Host operating system support 
Initially exclusive to Windows, it was ported to Linux in version 3.2 and macOS in version 3.4.

Manager 
For easier handling of multiple virtual machines at the same time and the change of its parameters, it is recommended to use 86Box with a GUI manager application. Some of them are 86Box Manager, 86Box Manager Lite and WinBox for 86Box, all available as free software too.

See also 
 PCem
 DOSBox
 DOSEMU
 QEMU
 Bochs
 Parallels
 VirtualBox
 VMware Fusion
 VMware Workstation
 Windows Virtual PC

References 

DOS emulators
DOS on IBM PC compatibles
Free emulation software
Free software programmed in C
Linux emulation software
Windows emulation software
X86 emulators